, was an admiral in the Imperial Japanese Navy during World War II.

Biography
Tsukahara was born in Fukui Prefecture, but his official residence was Kofu city, Yamanashi Prefecture, where he was raised. Tsukahara graduated from the 36th class of the Imperial Japanese Naval Academy in 1908. He was ranked 20th out of 119 cadets, and noted Admiral Chuichi Nagumo was his classmate. He served his midshipman duty aboard the cruisers Soya, and Iwate and battleship Okinoshima. After he was commissioned as an ensign in 1910, he was assigned to the Shikishima, followed by destroyer Yūdachi.

Tsukahara subsequently served on the Yamashiro and cruiser Aso.

Tsukahara graduated from the Navy Staff College in 1920, and was promoted to lieutenant commander. He held a number of staff positions within the Yokosuka Naval District, particularly pertaining to naval aviation. He was sent to the United States and Europe from 1925–1926, and on his return was assigned as executive officer to the aircraft carrier Hōshō.

On November 29, 1929, Tsukahara was promoted to captain, and was also given command of Ōi. From 1931-1932, he was part of the Japanese delegation to the Geneva Naval Disarmament Conference. On October 20, 1933, he was given command of the aircraft carrier Akagi.

Tsukahara was promoted to Rear admiral on November 15, 1935. He commanded a number of fighter squadrons, and was promoted on to Vice admiral on November 15, 1939. In April 1940, he became commander of the Chinkai Guard District, and from September 10, 1941 until  October 1, 1942, he was Commander in Chief of the 11th Air Fleet. Unlike western military services where most military aircraft were under Army control, the Japanese Imperial Navy maintained large land-based aerial forces.  In addition to seaplanes and maritime patrol aircraft, each of these Air Fleets had several wings of land-based fighters, dive bombers, torpedo bombers, and twin-engined medium bombers.  The exact composition was tailored by the Imperial Japanese Navy Air Service to the location and mission.  They also included a number of support ships for resupply and destroyers for protection of supply lanes.

Based out of Formosa when the war began, the 11th Air Fleet was involved in the invasion of the Philippines. Later it moved forward in support of Japanese offensives in the New Guinea campaign, and fought some air vs. naval actions south of New Guinea on the eastern side of Indonesia during the Dutch East Indies campaign.

Afterwards the 11th Air Fleet with the help of its dedicated supporting ships moved forward and engaged in operations flying during the Solomon Islands campaign from Rabaul, New Britain and other locations.  On August 8, 1942, after the Allied landings on Guadalcanal and Tulagi Tsukahara moved to Rabaul to more closely direct air attacks against Allied forces around Guadalcanal.  While at Rabaul, the scope of Vice admiral Tsukahara's command was expanded to include all naval forces in the New Guinea and Solomon Islands' area in addition to the 11th Air Fleet in what was renamed the Southeast Area Command.  Soon after this change he fell ill, was relieved and replaced in Rabaul by Vice-Admiral Jin'ichi Kusaka on October 1, 1942.

After recovering from illness, Tsukahara was appointed Director of Naval Air Command from December 1, 1942 to  September 15, 1944. Subsequently, he was commander in chief of the Yokosuka Naval District to  May 1, 1945.

Tsukahara was promoted to (full) Admiral on May 15, 1945, one of the last two officers promoted to this rank. He died in 1966, and his grave is at the Tama Reien Cemetery in Fuchū, Tokyo.

Notes

References

Further reading

 Online views of selections of the book:

External links

- Translation of the official record by the Japanese Demobilization Bureaux detailing the Imperial Japanese Army and Navy's participation in the Southwest Pacific area of the Pacific War.

1887 births
1966 deaths
Military personnel from Fukui Prefecture
Japanese admirals of World War II
Imperial Japanese Navy admirals
Japanese naval aviators
Imperial Japanese Navy Air Service